John Coubrough Christie (8 February 1881 – 21 November 1934) was a Scottish professional footballer who played as a right-back and left half in The Football League for rivals Manchester United and Manchester City. He also played in the Southern League for Bradford Park Avenue, Croydon Common and Brentford.

Personal life
As of 1901, Christie had worked as a railway porter. He served in the Royal Air Force during the First World War.

Honours
Croydon Common
Southern League Second Division: 1908–09

Brentford Reserves
Great Western Suburban League: 1910–11

Career statistics

References

1881 births
1934 deaths
Sportspeople from Chorley
Manchester United F.C. players
Manchester City F.C. players
English Football League players
Southern Football League players
Association football fullbacks
Association football wing halves
Bradford (Park Avenue) A.F.C. players
Croydon Common F.C. players
Brentford F.C. players
Altrincham F.C. players
Footballers from Glasgow
Scottish footballers
People from Calton
Anglo-Scots
Royal Air Force personnel of World War I